"Dedication to My Ex (Miss That)" is a song by R&B recording artist Lloyd, released on August 9, 2011 as the third single from his fourth studio album, King of Hearts (2011). The song, produced by Polow da Don and D. Smith from Zone 4 productions, features a verse from André 3000 of Outkast and is "narrated" by Lloyd's frequent collaborator and fellow New Orleans rapper Lil Wayne. The brass instrumentation was performed by Siraaj Amnesia James. The song was edited for radio in the United Kingdom (among other places), replacing the word "pussy" with "lovin'". The single performed average domestically, but reached the top 5 in the UK, Australia, and Ireland, also reaching the top 10 in Denmark, Netherlands and Austria. The song is Lloyd's biggest hit internationally to date.

Music video
The song's music video, directed by Bryan Barber, premiered on 106 & Park on September 13, 2011. André 3000 and Lil Wayne do not appear in the video; instead Wayne Brady and a cat lip-sync Wayne and Andre 3000's lyrics, respectively. The video featured Natalie La Rose as the leading female character.

Track listing

Charts and certifications

Weekly charts

Year-end charts

Certifications

Radio dates and release history

See also
 List of top 10 singles in 2011 (UK)
 List of top 10 singles in 2012 (UK)
 List of UK R&B Chart number-one singles of 2011

References

2011 singles
André 3000 songs
Songs written by André 3000
Lloyd (singer) songs
Song recordings produced by Polow da Don
Music videos directed by Bryan Barber
Songs written by Polow da Don
2011 songs